The Environment of Argentina  is characterised by high biodiversity.

Biodiversity 
Argentinas non living things are all animals and Subtropical plants dominate the Gran Chaco in the north, with the Dalbergia genus of trees well represented by Brazilian rosewood and the quebracho tree; also predominant the wacho white and black algarrobo trees (Prosopis alba and Prosopis nigra). Savannah-like areas exist in the drier regions nearer the Andes. Aquatic plants thrive in the wetlands of Argentina. In central Argentina the humid pampas are a true tallgrass prairie ecosystem.

The original pampa had virtually no trees; some imported species like the American sycamore or eucalyptus are present along roads or in towns and country estates (estancias). The only tree-like plant native to the pampa is the evergreen Ombú. The surface soils of the pampa are a deep black color, primarily mollisols, known commonly as humus. This makes the region one of the most agriculturally productive on Earth; however, this is also responsible for decimating much of the original ecosystem, to make way for commercial agriculture. The western pampas receive less rainfall, this dry pampa is a plain of short grasses or steppe.

Most of Patagonia lies within the rain shadow of the Andes, so the flora, shrubby bushes and plants, is suited to dry conditions. The soil is hard and rocky, making large-scale farming impossible except along river valleys. Coniferous forests in far western Patagonia and on the island of Tierra del Fuego, include alerce, ciprés de la cordillera, ciprés de las guaitecas, huililahuán, lleuque, mañío hembra and pehuén, while broadleaf trees include several species of Nothofagus such as coihue, lenga and ñire. Other introduced trees present in forestry plantations include spruce, cypress and pine. Common plants are the copihue and colihue.

In Cuyo, semiarid thorny bushes and other xerophile plants abound. Along the many rivers grasses and trees grow in significant numbers. The area presents optimal conditions for the large scale growth of grape vines. In northwest Argentina there are many species of cactus. No vegetation grows in the highest elevations (above ) because of the extreme altitude.

Many species live in the subtropical north. Prominent animals include big cats like the jaguar and puma; primates (howler monkey); large reptiles (crocodiles), the Argentine black and white tegu and a species of caiman. Other animals include the tapir, peccary, capybara, bush dog, and various species of turtle and tortoise. There are a wide variety of birds, notably hummingbirds, flamingos, toucans, and swallows.

The central grasslands are populated by the giant anteater, armadillo, pampas cat, maned wolf, mara, cavias, and the rhea (ñandú), a large flightless bird. Hawks, falcons, herons, and tinamous (perdiz, Argentine "false partridges") inhabit the region. There are also pampas deer and pampas foxes. Some of these species extend into Patagonia.

The western mountains are home to animals including the llama, guanaco and vicuña which are among the most recognizable species of South America. Also in this region are the fox, viscacha, Andean mountain cat, kodkod, and the largest flying bird in the New World, the Andean condor.

Southern Argentina is home to the cougar, huemul, pudú (the world's smallest deer), and introduced, non-native wild boar. The coast of Patagonia is rich in animal life: elephant seals, fur seals, sea lions and species of penguin. The far south is populated by cormorants.

The territorial waters of Argentina have abundant ocean life; mammals such as dolphins, orcas, and whales like the southern right whale, a major tourist draw for naturalists. Sea fish include sardines, Argentine hakes, dolphinfish, salmon, and sharks; also present are squid and king crab (centolla) in Tierra del Fuego. Rivers and streams in Argentina have many species of trout and the South American golden dorado fish. Well known snake species inhabiting Argentina include boa constrictors and a very venomous pit viper named the yarará. The hornero was elected the national bird after a survey in 1928.

Environmental issues

The largest oil spill in fresh water was caused by a Shell Petroleum tanker in the Río de la Plata, off Magdalena, on January 15, 1999, polluting the environment, drinking water, and local wildlife.

Argentina had a 2018 Forest Landscape Integrity Index mean score of 7.21/10, ranking it 47th globally out of 172 countries.

See also
 List of birds of Argentina
Protected areas of Argentina

References